Phyllis May Harding (15 December 1907 – 16 November 1992), later known by her married name Phyllis Turner, was an English backstroke and freestyle swimmer who competed for Great Britain in the 1924 Summer Olympics, 1928 Summer Olympics, 1932 Summer Olympics and 1936 Summer Olympics.

In the 1924 Olympics she won a silver medal in the 100-metre backstroke event. Four years later in Amsterdam she was third in her first round of 100-metre backstroke event and did not advance. In the 1932 Olympics she was fourth in the 100-metre backstroke event. In the 1936 Olympics she was seventh in the 100-metre backstroke event.

Harding was inducted into the International Swimming Hall of Fame as a "Pioneer Swimmer" in 1995.

See also
 List of members of the International Swimming Hall of Fame
 List of Olympic medalists in swimming (women)

References

External links

1907 births
1992 deaths
Female backstroke swimmers
British female freestyle swimmers
Olympic swimmers of Great Britain
Swimmers at the 1924 Summer Olympics
Swimmers at the 1928 Summer Olympics
Swimmers at the 1932 Summer Olympics
Swimmers at the 1936 Summer Olympics
Olympic silver medallists for Great Britain
English Olympic medallists
Swimmers at the 1930 British Empire Games
Swimmers at the 1934 British Empire Games
Commonwealth Games gold medallists for England
Commonwealth Games silver medallists for England
Commonwealth Games bronze medallists for England
European Aquatics Championships medalists in swimming
English backstroke swimmers
Medalists at the 1924 Summer Olympics
Olympic silver medalists in swimming
Commonwealth Games medallists in swimming
Medallists at the 1930 British Empire Games
Medallists at the 1934 British Empire Games